This list contains a list of EC numbers for the fifth group, EC 5, isomerases, placed in numerical order as determined by the Nomenclature Committee of the International Union of Biochemistry and Molecular Biology. All official information is tabulated at the website of the committee. The database is developed and maintained by Andrew McDonald.

EC 5.1: Epimerases and racemases

EC 5.1.1: Acting on Amino acids and Derivatives
 : alanine racemase
 : methionine racemase
 : glutamate racemase
 : proline racemase
 : lysine racemase
 : threonine racemase
 : diaminopimelate epimerase
 : 4-hydroxyproline epimerase
 : arginine racemase
 : amino-acid racemase
 : phenylalanine racemase (ATP-hydrolysing)
 : ornithine racemase
 : aspartate racemase
 : nocardicin-A epimerase
 : 2-aminohexano-6-lactam racemase
 : protein-serine epimerase
 : isopenicillin-N epimerase
 : serine racemase
 : L-Ala-D/L-Glu epimerase *	 
 : isoleucine 2-epimerase *	 
 : 4-hydroxyproline betaine 2-epimerase *	 
 : UDP-N-acetyl-α-D-muramoyl-L-alanyl-L-glutamate epimerase *	 
 : histidine racemase *	 
 *No Wikipedia article

EC 5.1.2: Acting on Hydroxy acids and Derivatives
 : lactate racemase
 : mandelate racemase
 : 3-hydroxybutyryl-CoA epimerase
 : acetoin racemase
 : tartrate epimerase
 : isocitrate epimerase
 : tagaturonate epimerase *
 *No Wikipedia article

EC 5.1.3: Acting on Carbohydrates and Derivatives
 : ribulose-phosphate 3-epimerase
 : UDP-glucose 4-epimerase
 : aldose 1-epimerase
 : L-ribulose-5-phosphate 4-epimerase
 : UDP-arabinose 4-epimerase
 : UDP-glucuronate 4-epimerase
 : UDP-N-acetylglucosamine 4-epimerase
 : N-acylglucosamine 2-epimerase
 : N-acylglucosamine-6-phosphate 2-epimerase
 : CDP-paratose 2-epimerase
 : cellobiose epimerase
 : The enzyme has never been purified and the activity was later shown not to exist
 : dTDP-4-dehydrorhamnose 3,5-epimerase
 : UDP-N-acetylglucosamine 2-epimerase (non-hydrolysing)
 : glucose-6-phosphate 1-epimerase
 : UDP-glucosamine 4-epimerase
 : heparosan-N-sulfate-glucuronate 5-epimerase
 : GDP-mannose 3,5-epimerase
 : chondroitin-glucuronate 5-epimerase
 : ADP-glyceromanno-heptose 6-epimeras
 : maltose epimerase
 : L-ribulose-5-phosphate 3-epimerase
 : UDP-2,3-diacetamido-2,3-dideoxyglucuronic acid 2-epimerase
 : N-acetylneuraminate epimerase
 : dTDP-L-rhamnose 4-epimerase
 :  N-acetyl-α-D-glucosaminyl-diphospho-ditrans,octacis-undecaprenol 4-epimerase *	 
 :  dTDP-4-dehydro-6-deoxy-D-glucose 3-epimerase *	 
 :  UDP-N-acetyl-L-fucosamine synthase *	 
 : L-fucose mutarotase *	 
 : D-psicose 3-epimerase *	 
 : D-tagatose 3-epimerase *	 
 : L-rhamnose mutarotase *	 
 :  2-epi-5-epi-valiolone epimerase *	 
 :  monoglucosyldiacylglycerol epimerase *	 
 :  2-epi-5-epi-valiolone 7-phosphate 2-epimerase *	 
 :  heparosan-glucuronate 5-epimerase *	 
 :  mannuronan 5-epimerase *	 
 :  D-erythrulose 1-phosphate 3-epimerase *	 
 :  L-erythrulose 4-phosphate epimerase. The activity has been shown not to take place. *	 
 :  D-tagatose 6-phosphate 4-epimerase *	 
 :  fructoselysine 3-epimerase *	 
 :  D-glucosamine-6-phosphate 4-epimerase *	 
 :  sulfoquinovose mutarotase *	 
 :  mannose 2-epimerase *	 

 *No Wikipedia article

EC 5.1.99: Acting on Other Compounds
 : methylmalonyl-CoA epimerase
 : 16-hydroxysteroid epimerase
 : allantoin racemase
 : α-methylacyl-CoA racemase
 : hydantoin racemase
 : NAD(P)H-hydrate epimerase
 : dihydroneopterin triphosphate 2′-epimerase *	 
 : 7,8-dihydroneopterin epimerase *
 *No Wikipedia article

EC 5.2: cis-trans-Isomerases

EC 5.2.1: cis-trans Isomerases (only sub-subclass identified to date)
 : maleate isomerase
 : maleylacetoacetate isomerase
 : maleylpyruvate isomerase
 : linoleate isomerase
 : furylfuramide isomerase
 : peptidylprolyl isomerase
 : farnesol 2-isomerase
 : 2-chloro-4-carboxymethylenebut-2-en-1,4-olide isomerase
 : The existence of this enzyme has been called into question by one of the authors of the reference cited
 : ζ-carotene isomerase
 : prolycopene isomerase
 : β-carotene isomerase

EC 5.3: Intramolecular Oxidoreductases

EC 5.3.1: Interconverting Aldoses and Ketoses
 : triose-phosphate isomerase
 : deleted
 : D-arabinose isomerase
 : L-arabinose isomerase
 : xylose isomerase
 : ribose-5-phosphate isomerase
 : mannose isomerase
 : mannose-6-phosphate isomerase
 : glucose-6-phosphate isomerase
 : Now , glucosamine-6-phosphate deaminase
 : deleted
 : glucuronate isomerase
 : arabinose-5-phosphate isomerase
 : L-rhamnose isomerase
 : D-lyxose ketol-isomerase
 : 1-(5-phosphoribosyl)-5-[(5-phosphoribosylamino)methylideneamino]imidazole-4-carboxamide isomerase
 : 5-dehydro-4-deoxy-D-glucuronate isomerase
 : deleted: reaction is due to  glucose-6-phosphate isomerase, in the presence of arsenate, or  xylose isomerase
 :  Now , glutamine—fructose-6-phosphate transaminase (isomerizing)
 : ribose isomerase
 : corticosteroid side-chain-isomerase
 : hydroxypyruvate isomerase
 : S-methyl-5-thioribose-1-phosphate isomerase
 : phosphoribosylanthranilate isomerase
 : L-fucose isomerase
 : galactose-6-phosphate isomerase
 : 6-phospho-3-hexuloisomerase
 : D-sedoheptulose 7-phosphate isomerase
 : ribose 1,5-bisphosphate isomerase *	 
 : 5-deoxy-glucuronate isomerase *	 
 : sulfoquinovose isomerase *	 
 : (4S)-4-hydroxy-5-phosphooxypentane-2,3-dione isomerase *	 
 : L-erythrulose 1-phosphate isomerase *	 
 : D-erythrulose 4-phosphate isomerase *	 
 : 2-dehydrotetronate isomerase *	 
 : D-apiose isomerase *	
 *No Wikipedia article

EC 5.3.2: Interconverting Keto- and Enol-Groups
 : phenylpyruvate tautomerase
 : oxaloacetate tautomerase
 : TDP-4-oxo-6-deoxy-α-glucose-3,4-oxoisomerase (dTDP-3-dehydro-6-deoxy-α-D-galactopyranose-forming)
 : TDP-4-oxo-6-deoxy-α-D-glucose-3,4-oxoisomerase (dTDP-3-dehydro-6-deoxy-α-D-glucopyranose-forming)
 : 2,3-diketo-5-methylthiopentyl-1-phosphate enolase
 : 2-hydroxymuconate tautomerase
 : ascopyrone tautomerase
 : 4-oxalomesaconate tautomerase

EC 5.3.3: Transposing C=C Bonds
 : steroid Δ-isomerase
 : isopentenyl-diphosphate Δ-isomerase
 : vinylacetyl-CoA Δ-isomerase
 : muconolactone Δ-isomerase
 : cholestenol Δ-isomerase
 : methylitaconate Δ-isomerase
 : aconitate Δ-isomerase
 : Δ3-Δ2-enoyl-CoA isomerase
 : prostaglandin-A1 Δ-isomerase
 : 5-carboxymethyl-2-hydroxymuconate Δ-isomerase
 : isopiperitenone Δ-isomerase
 : L-dopachrome isomerase
 : polyenoic fatty acid isomerase
 : trans-2-decenoyl-[acyl-carrier protein] isomerase
 : Now , ascopyrone tautomerase
 : Now , 4-oxalomesaconate tautomerase
 : trans-2,3-dihydro-3-hydroxyanthranilate isomerase
 : 2-(1,2-epoxy-1,2-dihydrophenyl)acetyl-CoA isomerase
 : 3-[(4R)-4-hydroxycyclohexa-1,5-dien-1-yl]-2-oxopropanoate isomerase *
 : Now , 2-hydroxyisobutanoyl-CoA mutase
 : Δ3,5-Δ2,4-dienoyl-CoA isomerase *
 : lutein isomerase *
 : S-methyl-5-thioribulose 1-phosphate isomerase *
 *No Wikipedia article

EC 5.3.4: Transposing S-S Bonds
 : protein disulfide-isomerase

EC 5.3.99: Other Intramolecular Oxidoreductases
 : prostaglandin-D synthase
 : prostaglandin-E synthase
 : prostaglandin-I synthase
 : thromboxane-A synthase
 : allene-oxide cyclase
 : styrene-oxide isomerase
 : capsanthin/capsorubin synthase
 : neoxanthin synthase
 : thiazole tautomerase
 : 2-keto-myo-inositol isomerase *
 *No Wikipedia article

EC 5.4: Intramolecular Transferases

EC 5.4.1: Transferring Acyl Groups
 : lysolecithin acylmutase
 : Now , precorrin-8X methylmutase	
 : 2-methylfumaryl-CoA isomerase *
 : D-galactarolactone isomerase *
 *No Wikipedia article

EC 5.4.2: Phosphotransferases (Phosphomutases)
 : phosphoglucomutase (α-D-glucose-1,6-bisphosphate-dependent)
 : phosphoacetylglucosamine mutase
 : bisphosphoglycerate mutase
 : phosphoglucomutase (glucose-cofactor)
 : β-phosphoglucomutase
 : phosphopentomutase
 : phosphomannomutase
 : phosphoenolpyruvate mutase
 : phosphoglucosamine mutase
 : phosphoglycerate mutase (2,3-diphosphoglycerate-dependent)
 : phosphoglycerate mutase (2,3-diphosphoglycerate-independent)
 : phosphogalactosamine mutase *
 *No Wikipedia article

EC 5.4.3: Transferring Amino Groups
 : lysine 2,3-aminomutase
 : lysine 5,6-aminomutase
 : D-ornithine 4,5-aminomutase
 : tyrosine 2,3-aminomutase
 : leucine 2,3-aminomutase
 : glutamate-1-semialdehyde 2,1-aminomutase
 : glutamate 2,3-aminomutase
 : phenylalanine aminomutase (L-β-phenylalanine forming) *
 : phenylalanine aminomutase (D-β-phenylalanine forming) *
 *No Wikipedia article

EC 5.4.4: Transferring hydroxy groups
 : (hydroxyamino)benzene mutase
 : isochorismate synthase
 : 3-(hydroxyamino)phenol mutase
 : geraniol isomerase
 : 9,12-octadecadienoate 8-hydroperoxide 8R-isomerase
 : 9,12-octadecadienoate 8-hydroperoxide 8S-isomerase
 : hydroperoxy icosatetraenoate isomerase *
 : linalool isomerase *
 *No Wikipedia article

EC 5.4.99: Transferring Other Groups
 : methylaspartate mutase
 : methylmalonyl-CoA mutase
 : 2-acetolactate mutase
 : 2-methyleneglutarate mutase
 : chorismate mutase
 : Now , isochorismate synthase
 : lanosterol synthase
 : cycloartenol synthase
 : UDP-galactopyranose mutase
 : isomaltulose synthase
 : tRNA pseudouridine38-40 synthase
 : isobutyryl-CoA mutase
 : 4-carboxymethyl-4-methylbutenolide mutase
 : (1→4)-α-D-glucan 1-α-D-glucosylmutase
 : maltose α-D-glucosyltransferase
 : squalene—hopene cyclase
 : 5-(carboxyamino)imidazole ribonucleotide mutase
 : 16S rRNA pseudouridine516 synthase
 : 23S rRNA pseudouridine2457 synthase
 : 23S rRNA pseudouridine2604 synthase
 : 23S rRNA pseudouridine2605 synthase
 : 23S rRNA pseudouridine1911/1915/1917 synthase
 : 23S rRNA pseudouridine955/2504/2580 synthase
 : tRNA pseudouridine55 synthase
 : tRNA pseudouridine65 synthase
 : tRNA pseudouridine13 synthase
 : RNA pseudouridine32 synthase
 : 23S rRNA pseudouridine746 synthase
 : UDP-arabinopyranose mutase
 : thalianol synthase
 : protostadienol synthase
 : cucurbitadienol synthase
 : germanicol synthase
 : taraxerol synthase
 : isomultiflorenol synthase
 : dammaradiene synthase
 : camelliol C synthase
 : β-amyrin synthase
 : α-amyrin synthase
 : lupeol synthase
 : tRNA pseudouridine31 synthase
 : 21S rRNA pseudouridine2819 synthase
 : mitochondrial tRNA pseudouridine27/28 synthase
 : tRNA pseudouridine38/39 synthase
 : shionone synthase
 : parkeol synthase
 : achilleol B synthase
 : glutinol synthase
 : friedelin synthase
 : baccharis oxide synthase
 : α-seco-amyrin synthase
 : marneral synthase
 : β-seco-amyrin synthase
 : δ-amyrin synthase
 : tirucalladienol synthase
 : baruol synthase
 : methylornithine synthase
 : dTDP-fucopyranose mutase *	 
 : cobalt-precorrin-8 methylmutase *	 
 : precorrin-8X methylmutase *	 
 : D-ribose pyranase *	 
 : ethylmalonyl-CoA mutase *	 
 : 2-hydroxyisobutanoyl-CoA mutase *	 
 : pre-α-onocerin synthase *	 
 : α-onocerin synthase *	 
 : 4-amino-4-deoxychorismate mutase *
 *No Wikipedia article

EC 5.5: Intramolecular Lyases

EC 5.5.1: Intramolecular lyases (only sub-subclass identified to date)
 : muconate cycloisomerase
 : 3-carboxy-cis,cis-muconate cycloisomerase
 : tetrahydroxypteridine cycloisomerase
 : inositol-3-phosphate synthase
 : carboxy-cis,cis-muconate cyclase
 : chalcone isomerase
 : chloromuconate cycloisomerase
 : (+)-bornyl diphosphate synthase
 : cycloeucalenol cycloisomerase
 : α-pinene-oxide decyclase
 : dichloromuconate cycloisomerase
 : copalyl diphosphate synthase
 : ent-copalyl diphosphate synthase
 : syn-copalyl-diphosphate synthase
 : terpentedienyl-diphosphate synthase
 : halimadienyl-diphosphate synthase
 : (S)-β-macrocarpene synthase
 : lycopene ε-cyclase
 : lycopene β-cyclase
 : prosolanapyrone-III cycloisomerase
 : copal-8-ol diphosphate synthase. The enzyme was discovered at the public-review stage to have been misclassified and so was withdrawn. See , copal-8-ol diphosphate hydratase
 : (–)-bornyl diphosphate synthase *
 : aklanonic acid methyl ester cyclase *
 : tocopherol cyclase *
 : 3,6-anhydro-L-galactonate cycloisomerase *
 : nogalonic acid methyl ester cyclase *
 : D-galactarolactone cycloisomerase *
 : (–)-kolavenyl diphosphate synthase *
 : (+)-kolavenyl diphosphate synthase *
 : labda-7,13-dienyl diphosphate synthase *
 : hapalindole H synthase *
 : 12-epi-hapalindole U synthase *
 : 12-epi-fischerindole U synthase *
 : (+)-cis,trans-nepetalactol synthase *
 : (+)-cis,cis-nepetalactol synthase *
 : (+)-cis,cis-nepetalactol synthase *
 *No Wikipedia article

EC 5.6: Isomerases altering macromolecular conformation

EC 5.6.1: Enzymes altering polypeptide conformation or assembly
(No entries at present)

EC 5.6.2: Enzymes altering nucleic acid conformation
(No entries at present)

EC 5.99: Other Isomerases

EC 5.99.1: Sole sub-subclass for isomerases that do not belong in the other subclasses
 : thiocyanate isomerase
 : Now , DNA topoisomerase
 : Now , DNA topoisomerase (ATP-hydrolysing)	 
 : 2-hydroxychromene-2-carboxylate isomerase

References

EC5
Isomerases